Praescobura is a butterfly genus of skippers. It contains only one species, Praescobura chrysomaculata, which is found in northern Vietnam.

References

 Devyatkin, A. L., 2002: Hesperiidae of Vietnam: 11. New taxa of the subfamily Hesperiinae (Lepidoptera: Hesperiidae). Atalanta 33 (1–2): 127–135. Abstract .

Erionotini
Monotypic butterfly genera